Chester Lyons may refer to:
 C. P. Lyons (Chester Peter Lyons), Canadian outdoorsman and natural historian
 Chester A. Lyons, American cinematographer